This is Coventry City Football Club progress in the 2003–04 season. This season the Sky Blues will play in the First Division and will feature in the FA Cup and the League Cup.

Matches

First Division

FA Cup

League Cup

Championship data

League table

Results summary

Round by round

Scores Overview

Season statistics

Stats and goals

|-
|colspan="14"|Player's featured for Coventry who left before end of the season:

|}

Goalscorers

Overall

Transfers

In
  Graham Barrett – unattached (last at  Arsenal), 30 May
  Claus Bech Jørgensen – unattached (last at  Bradford City), 4 August
  Steve Staunton – unattached (last at  Aston Villa), 15 August
  Onandi Lowe –  Rushden & Diamonds, 25 March, free
  Dele Adebola – unattached (last at  Crystal Palace)
  Andy Morrell – unattached (last at  Wrexham)
  Bjarni Guðjónsson – unattached (last at  VfL Bochum)
  Pegguy Arphexad – unattached (last at  Liverpool
  Scott Shearer –  Albion Rovers
  Patrick Suffo –  Al-Hilal
  Gavin Ward –  Walsall
  Michael Doyle –  Celtic
  Éric Deloumeaux –  Aberdeen

Out
  Robert Betts – released, 23 May (later joined  Rochdale)
  Lee Fowler – released, 13 November (later joined  Huddersfield Town)
  Gary McAllister – re-signed as player-manager, 12 January
  Jay Bothroyd – released (later joined  Perugia on 11 July)
  John Eustace – released (later joined  Stoke City on 18 July)
  Keith O'Neill – retired
  Youssef Chippo –  Al Sadd
  Gary Montgomery –  Rotherham United
  Morten Hyldgaard –  Hibernian
  Christian Yulu
  Fabien Debec
  Sean Cooney
  Tom Bates

Loans in
  Bjarni Guðjónsson –  VfL Bochum, 16 January, five-month-long loan
  Stephen Warnock –  Liverpool, season-long loan
  Martin Grainger –  Birmingham City
  Johnnie Jackson –  Tottenham Hotspur
  Yazid Mansouri –  Le Havre
  Sebastian Olszar –  Portsmouth
  Courtney Pitt –  Portsmouth
  Brian Kerr –  Newcastle United
  Peter Clarke –  Everton

Loans out
  Lee Fowler –  Huddersfield Town
  Barry Quinn –  Rushden & Diamonds

References

Coventry City F.C. seasons
Coventry City